Dhinsa is a surname. Notable people with the surname include:

Sunny Dhinsa (born 1993), Indian-Canadian wrestler 
Gurmeet Singh Dhinsa (born 1962), Indian-American former gas station magnate and convicted murderer

See also
 Dhindsa